The 2018 Indonesia President's Cup was the third edition of Indonesia President's Cup, held by the Football Association of Indonesia (PSSI) as a pre-season tournament for the 2018 Liga 1. The tournament started on 16 January and ended on 17 February 2018.

The broadcasting rights were granted to Elang Mahkota Teknologi group; matches were aired by their channels: Indosiar and O-Channel.

The 2018 Indonesia President's Cup Final was played at the Gelora Bung Karno Stadium in Jakarta, with Persija defeating Bali United by 3–0 to win their first title. Arema were the title holders, but they were eliminated by Sriwijaya in the quarter-finals.

Teams
Initially, the tournament was planned to be competed by 20 teams: 18 teams from 2018 Liga 1 and 2 best placed teams from 2017 Liga 2. Then, Persipura Jayapura decided not to participate in this year's tournament. Kalteng Putra was confirmed to replace them.

Draw
The 20 teams were divided into five groups. Each group consisted of four teams.

Venues
Seven venues in seven cities were selected for the tournament. On 21 January 2018, the venue of Group E officially moved from Gajayana Stadium to Kanjuruhan Stadium after two matches because the pitch of Gajayana was heavily damaged by bad weather and bad drainage.

Regulations
Player registration regulations are as follows:
 Clubs can register at least 18 players and a maximum of 36 players;
 Clubs are required to register 7 players under the age of 23 (born on or after 1 January 1996);
 Clubs can register a maximum of 6 foreign players, including one slot for a player from AFC countries. But only 4 foreign players (3+1 Asia) are eligible in a match;
 Player registration is opened from 10 January 2018 until a day before the first match of each group.

Group stage
The Organising Committee (OC) announced the group draw on 9 January 2018. The group draw was determined by the host, the team's ranking in the 2017 Liga 1 competition, geographical factors, and commercial interests.

Group A

 All matches played in Bandung, West Java
 Times listed are local (UTC+7:00)

Group B

 All matches played in Tenggarong, East Kalimantan
 Times listed are local (UTC+8:00)

Group C

 All matches played in Surabaya, East Java
 Times listed are local (UTC+7:00)

Group D

 All matches played in Gianyar, Bali
 Times listed are local (UTC+8:00)

Group E

 Two matches played in Malang and four matches played in Malang Regency, East Java
 Times listed are local (UTC+7:00)

Ranking of runner-up teams

Knockout stage
Extra time would not be played in the quarter-finals. If a match ended with a draw, it would go straight to a penalty shoot-out to determine the winner. The away goals rule, extra time and penalty shoot-out would be used in the semi-finals, if necessary. The third place match would also go straight to a penalty shoot-out if tied after normal playing time. Extra time and penalty shoot-out would also be used in the final, if necessary.

Bracket

Quarter-finals
The draw for the quarter-finals was held at Sultan Hotel, Jakarta, on 31 January 2018.

Semi-finals

Persija won 5–1 on aggregate.

Bali United won 1–0 on aggregate.

Third place

Final

Statistics

Goalscorers

Awards 
 Best supporters: Bobotoh (Persib)
 Best referee: Oki Dwi Putra
 Top scorer and best player: Marko Šimić (Persija, 11 goals)
 Best young player: Rezaldi Hehanusa (Persija)
 Fair-play award: Bali United

Tournament team rankings 
As per statistical convention in football, matches decided in extra time were counted as wins and losses, while matches decided by penalty shoot-outs were counted as draws.

See also
 2018 Liga 1
 2018 Liga 2
 2018 Liga 3
 2018–19 Piala Indonesia

References

Piala Presiden
Piala Presiden